The 1890 FA Cup final was contested by Blackburn Rovers and The Wednesday at the Kennington Oval. Blackburn won 6–1 with goals scored by William Townley (3), Nat Walton, Jack Southworth and Joe Lofthouse. The Wednesday's goal was scored by Albert Mumford. Townley's hat-trick was the first in an FA Cup Final.

Haydn Arthur Morley, who was Wednesday's captain in the final, earned his living as a solicitor. The match was the last of seven consecutive and eight total finals officiated by Major Francis Marindin of the Royal Engineers, a veteran of the Crimean War. The match set the record for the highest scoring FA Cup Final, later equalled by the 1953 final. Blackburn's six goals remain the record for the most by one team in an FA Cup final, equalled by Bury in 1903 and by Manchester City in 2019.

Match

References

External links
1889–90 Competition Results at rsssf.com
FA Cup Final lineups 
Soccerbase summary
Match report at www.fa-cupfinals.co.uk

1890
Final
Blackburn Rovers F.C. matches
Sheffield Wednesday F.C. matches
March 1890 sports events
1889 sports events in London